Bustard Island is Alberta's largest sand island, It is located in Lake Athabasca in the part of the Fidler-Greywillow Wildland Provincial Park. The Lucas Islands lie northeast from the island, the other major island in the park; Burntwood Island lays  to the north.

Geography
Storm beaches can be found around the island with sand shores, as well as rock points. There are two internal lagoons on the island. The island has very few wetland/aquatic areas, the best documented is the large lagoon on the east side of the island. Leymus mollis (American dune grass) is common the most on the sandy shores of the island. The island hosts large colonies of California Gull.

References

External links
GeoGratis Bustard Island
Fidler-Greywillow Wildland Provincial Park

Lake islands of Alberta
Regional Municipality of Wood Buffalo
Lake Athabasca